is a manga series by Osamu Tezuka that was serialized in Shogakukan's Weekly Shōnen Sunday December 18, 1960 to August 20, 1961. The published chapters were collected in two volumes.

Plot 
The series take place in the future, after mankind migrated to the planet Mars, home to the Martians. Before long, the humans begin persecuting the Martians, and the two species form a mutual hatred of each other.

The action takes place Heden City, a frontier town and home to the Hoshino family. One day, Ken Minakami comes from Earth to visit her relatives, the Hoshino family. Not long after she arrives, a mysterious gunman calling himself "Captain Ken" appears in Heden City. Captain Ken is a human that fights on the side of the Martians, protecting them from those who wish to exploit them for their own gain.

Mamoru Hoshino, the eldest son of the Hoshino family, begins to suspect that Ken Minakami may be the mysterious gunslinger, Captain Ken.

Characters 

 Captain Ken – A strange space cowboy who fights for the Martians.  While he does not wear a mask, his real identity is a secret.
 Arrow – Captain Ken's horse.
 Ken Minakami – A relative of the Hoshino family who has come to Mars from Earth.  Mamoru Hoshino suspects that she might be the true identity of Captain Ken.
 Mamoru Hoshino – The eldest son of the Hoshino family who works on his family's farm.  He is highly suspicious that Ken Minakami may actually be Captain Ken.
 Governor Debun
 Lamp
 Double
 Sheriff Notaarin – Sheriff of Heden City.
 Pavilion – A Martian native.
 Napoleon

References

External links 
 Captain Ken in the Tezuka World database
 

Osamu Tezuka manga
Digital Manga Publishing titles
1960 manga
Shōnen manga
Space Western anime and manga
Shogakukan manga